The Cicero Goddard Peck House is a historic house at 18 Mechanicsville Road in Hinesburg, Vermont.  Built in 1896 by a prominent town benefactor, it is a well-preserved example of Queen Anne Victorian architecture.  It was listed on the National Register of Historic Places in 2010.

Description and history
The Cicero Goddard Peck House stands in the village Hinesburg, on the south side of Mechanicsville Road just east of its junction with Vermont Route 116.  It is a -story wood-frame structure, basically L-shaped, with a main block whose gable is perpendicular to the road, and a side ell with a cross gable.  A single-story porch is set at the crook of the ell, and a polygonal three-story tower projects from the front right corner.  The exterior is finished in a combination of wooden clapboards and scallop-cut shingles, and there is a projecting single-story polygonal bay on the front facade.  The porch is supported by turned posts, and has a balustrade with square balusters.  The interior of the house retains many original period finishes and features, including pocket doors, a china cabinet in the dining room, and original moulding and floors.

The house was built in 1896 for Cicero Goddard Peck.  The Peck family was locally prominent: Peck's uncle Asahel served as Governor of Vermont, and his father Nahum was a lawyer who also served in the state legislature.  Peck himself was a prominent local dairy farmer, who helped organize a local cooperative and served in town offices.  He bequested to the town an endowment known as the Peck Estate, whose proceeds support the town's schools.

See also
National Register of Historic Places listings in Chittenden County, Vermont

References

Houses on the National Register of Historic Places in Vermont
National Register of Historic Places in Chittenden County, Vermont
Houses completed in 1896
Houses in Chittenden County, Vermont
Hinesburg, Vermont